{{DISPLAYTITLE:C18H23NO}}
The molecular formula C18H23NO (molar mass: 269.38 g/mol, exact mass: 269.1780 u) may refer to:

 Bifemelane
 4-Methyldiphenhydramine
 Moxastine, or mephenhydramine
 Orphenadrine